Bettino Ricasoli, 1st Count of Brolio, 2nd Baron Ricasoli (9 March 180923 October 1880) was an Italian statesman. He was a central figure in the politics of Italy during and after the unification of Italy. He led the Moderate Party.

Biography
Ricasoli was born in Florence. Left an orphan at eighteen, with an estate heavily in debt, he was by special decree of the grand duke of Tuscany declared of age and entrusted with the guardianship of his younger brothers. He was Catholic.

Interrupting his studies, he withdrew to Brolio, and by careful management disencumbered the family possessions. In 1847 he founded the journal La Patria, and addressed to the grand duke a memorial suggesting remedies for the difficulties of the state. In 1848 he was elected Gonfaloniere of Florence, but resigned on account of the anti-Liberal tendencies of the grand duke.

As Tuscan minister of the interior in 1859 he promoted the union of Tuscany with Piedmont, which took place on March 12, 1860. Elected Italian deputy in 1861, he succeeded Cavour in the premiership. As premier he admitted the Garibaldian volunteers to the regular army, revoked the decree of exile against Mazzini, and attempted reconciliation with the Vatican; but his efforts were rendered ineffectual by the non possumus of the pope.

Disdainful of the intrigues of his rival Rattazzi, he found himself obliged in 1862 to resign office, but returned to power in 1866. On this occasion he refused Napoleon III's offer to cede Venetia to Italy, on condition that Italy should abandon the Prussian alliance, and also refused the Prussian decoration of the Black Eagle because La Marmora, author of the alliance, was not to receive it.

Upon the departure of the French troops from Rome at the end of 1866 he again attempted to conciliate the Vatican with a convention, in virtue of which Italy would have restored to the Church the property of the suppressed religious orders in return for the gradual payment of 24,000,000. In order to mollify the Vatican he conceded the exequatur to forty-five bishops inimical to the Italian régime. The Vatican accepted his proposal, but the Italian Chamber proved refractory, and, though dissolved by Ricasoli, returned more hostile than before. Without waiting for a vote, Ricasoli resigned office and thenceforward practically disappeared from political life, speaking in the Chamber only upon rare occasions. He died at his Castello di Brolio on 23 October 1880.

The barone created the modern recipe of Chianti wine; though a formula of specific grape percentages is often erroneously attributed to him, his switch in focus to Sangiovese as the lead grape in the blend would have lasting implications for both Tuscan and Italian wine. The family named firm (Ricasoli 1141) still produces wine at Brolio.

His private life and public career were marked by the utmost integrity, and by a rigid austerity which earned him the name of the Iron Baron. In spite of the failure of his ecclesiastical scheme, he remains one of the most noteworthy figures of the Italian Risorgimento.

See also
History of Chianti

References

External links
Discorsi dei ministri Ricasoli Bettino, Migletti, Della Rovere, Peruzzi, Menabrea, e Cordova sulla Questione Romana e Sulla Condizione Provencie Napoletane
Barone Ricasoli family Chianti Classico winery's - Ricasoli history

|-

1809 births
1880 deaths
Politicians from Florence
Grand Duchy of Tuscany people
Counts of Italy
Italian Roman Catholics
Historical Right politicians
Italian Ministers of the Interior
Prime Ministers of Italy
Foreign ministers of Italy
Deputies of Legislature VIII of the Kingdom of Italy
Deputies of Legislature IX of the Kingdom of Italy
Deputies of Legislature X of the Kingdom of Italy
Deputies of Legislature XI of the Kingdom of Italy
Deputies of Legislature XII of the Kingdom of Italy
Deputies of Legislature XIII of the Kingdom of Italy
Deputies of Legislature XIV of the Kingdom of Italy
Politicians of Tuscany
Italian people of the Italian unification
Italian newspaper founders
Knights of the Order of Saint Joseph